Margaret Pleasant Douroux is an American gospel songwriter, teacher, and author. She works in Bible-based ministries and song composition.

Early life and education 
Margaret Pleasant Douroux was born on March 21, 1941, in Los Angeles, California, to Olga and Earl A. Pleasant and was one of six children.  Earl was a gospel singer who toured with Mahalia Jackson.

At an early age, she began singing in the children’s choir at the Baptist church where her father served as pastor. She went on to become the accompanist for the Sunday School Baptist Training Union and the Young People’s Choir. For 12 years she was director and accompanist for the Young Adult Choir and Orchestra at Mount Moriah Baptist Church, Los Angeles. During these years, Douroux was heavily influenced by Gospel music.

Douroux began her schooling in the Los Angeles public school system. She attended Southern University in Baton Rouge, Louisiana, in the 1960s, and then earned a BA in music from California State University, Long Beach in 1964.  She received both her MS and MA in Education and Educational Psychology from the University of Southern California in 1968 and 1978 respectively. Douroux would go on to earn a Ph.D. in education from the University of Beverly Hills.

Career 
Douroux worked as an elementary school teacher for 13 years. She also worked as a second-grade teacher for two years, as a counselor, and as an educational psychologist for twelve years. Douroux also worked with her surrounding community in music and schooling.

During the course of her music career, Douroux wrote more than 100 gospel songs, some of which have been recorded by artists like Nikki Giovanni, the Mighty Clouds of Joy, and James Cleveland's Gospel Music Workshop of America's Mass Choir. She has also held gospel music workshops throughout the United States and Europe.

Some of her feature works include: 'We’re Blessed,' 'Rivers of Joy,' 'Give Me A Clean Heart,' 'If It Had Not Been For The Lord On My Side,' 'Trees,' 'I’m Glad,'  'He Decided To Die,' and 'What Shall I Render'.

Community involvement 
For five years, Douroux was the minister of music and the adult choir director for the Mount Moriah Baptist Church of Los Angeles, as well as the Minister of Music and Choir Director for the Greater New Bethel Baptist Church in Inglewood for more than 40 years.

Douroux is the founder and CEO of the Heritage Music Foundation (HMF), an organization advocating the advancement and preservation of gospel music.

References 

1941 births
Living people
American gospel singers
People from Los Angeles
University of Southern California alumni
Musicians from Long Beach, California
Baptists from the United States